Fugitive from Montreal is a 1950 French-Canadian drama film directed by Jean Devaivre, written by Charles Exbrayat, and starring René Dary, Patricia Roc and Paul Dupuis. A Royal Canadian Mounted Police officer tries to prevent a former wartime comrade from France becoming mixed up with criminal activities. It was released in Canada on 17 November 1950 and in France on 17 August 1951.

Cast
 René Dary – Pierre Chambrac
 Patricia Roc – Helene Bering
 Paul Dupuis – Paul Laforet
 Albert Miller – Anton

References

External links

1950 films
1950 drama films
1950s French-language films
Films directed by Jean Devaivre
French drama films
Canadian black-and-white films
Canadian drama films
French black-and-white films
1950s Canadian films
1950s French films